Adnan Zildžović (born 28 October 1969) is a Bosnian professional football manager and former player.

Club career
Zildžović started his career in 1986 with his hometown club Jedinstvo Brčko and later had foreign spells with Steklar, Celje and Korotan Prevalje in Slovenia.

He has also played for 1. Suhler SV 06 and SV Waldhof Mannheim in Germany and for Krško in Slovenia, before retiring from active football in 2001.

International career
Zildžović represented Yugoslavia at under-18 level.

Managerial career
In his managerial career, Zildžović has managed Krško, Krka, Bela Krajina, Drava Ptuj, Al-Taawoun FC U23, Bylis Ballsh, Radomlje, Mladost Doboj Kakanj, Zvijezda 09, and Rudar Velenje.

With Krka in 2007, he won the 2006–07 Slovenian Third League (West Division).

On 17 August 2018, Zildžović became the new manager of Premier League of Bosnia and Herzegovina club Mladost Doboj Kakanj. On 8 April 2019, after making a series of five matches without a win in the league, which culminated with a 2–0 home loss against Tuzla City two days before, Zildžović decided to leave Mladost.

On 9 October 2019, he was named new manager of Bosnian Premier League team Zvijezda 09. Zildžović decided to leave Zvijezda on 9 March 2020.

Honours

Manager
Krka 
Slovenian Third League (West): 2006–07

References

External links
Adnan Zildžović at Soccerway

1969 births
Living people
People from Brčko District
Association football midfielders
Yugoslav footballers
Bosnia and Herzegovina footballers
Slovenian footballers
FK Jedinstvo Brčko players
NK Celje players
1. Suhler SV 06 players
SV Waldhof Mannheim players
Maccabi Jaffa F.C. players
Hapoel Jerusalem F.C. players
NK Korotan Prevalje players
NK Krško players
Slovenian PrvaLiga players
Bosnia and Herzegovina expatriate footballers
Slovenian expatriate footballers
Expatriate footballers in Germany
Expatriate footballers in Israel
Bosnia and Herzegovina expatriate sportspeople in Germany
Bosnia and Herzegovina expatriate sportspeople in Israel
Slovenian expatriate sportspeople in Germany
Slovenian expatriate sportspeople in Israel
Bosnia and Herzegovina football managers
Slovenian football managers
NK Krško managers
NK Krka managers
KF Bylis Ballsh managers
NK Radomlje managers
FK Mladost Doboj Kakanj managers
FK Zvijezda 09 managers
NK Rudar Velenje managers
Kategoria Superiore managers
Premier League of Bosnia and Herzegovina managers
Bosnia and Herzegovina expatriate football managers
Expatriate football managers in Albania